Justin Parnell (born 1988) is an American basketball coach. Since 2016 he has served as the head men's basketball coach at the Oregon Institute of Technology.

Coaching career

Oregon Tech
In 2016, the Oregon Institute of Technology hired Parnell, replacing previous coach of 45 years Danny Miles.

Awards and honors
 Cascade Conference Coach of the Year (2019) 
 NABC 30 Under 30 Team (2018)

Head coaching record

References

1989 births
Living people
American men's basketball coaches
American men's basketball players
Basketball coaches from Oregon
Basketball players from Oregon
College men's basketball head coaches in the United States
College men's basketball players in the United States
Northwest Nazarene University alumni
Oregon Institute of Technology alumni
Oregon Tech Hustlin' Owls men's basketball coaches
People from Douglas County, Oregon